James Renwick (30 May 1790 – 12 January 1863), was an English-American scientist and engineer.

Early life
He was born in Liverpool, England, on 30 May 1790. He was the son of Jane Jeffrey Renwick (1773–1850) and William Renwick (1769–1808). His paternal grandfather was James Renwick (1743–1803).

He graduated from Columbia College in 1807.

Career
In 1820, he was appointed professor of natural philosophy in that college, a position he held until 1854.  In 1838, he was appointed by the U.S. government one of the commissioners to explore the line of the boundary, then settled by the Webster–Ashburton Treaty, between Maine and New Brunswick. 

In 1828, Renwick was elected to the American Philosophical Society. 

In addition to his collegiate duties he wrote the biographies of Robert Fulton, David Rittenhouse, and Count Rumford, in Sparks's American Biography; a Memoir of DeWitt Clinton (1834); and a Treatise on the Steam-engine (1830). His textbooks, Outlines of Natural Philosophy (1822), Elements of Mechanics (1832), and First Principles of Chemistry (1840) were among the first works of their kind published in the United States, the first and third of these, along with his other educational works, passing through multiple editions. He was elected an Associate Fellow of the American Academy of Arts and Sciences in 1863.

Engineering on the Morris Canal
Renwick was also responsible for the idea and initial design of the inclined planes on the Morris Canal. The design of these planes were later copied for the Elbląg Canal in Poland.

Personal life
He married Margaret Anne Brevoort (1791–1868), from a wealthy and socially prominent New York family. Together, they were the parents of:

 Henry Brevoort Renwick (1817–1895), who was a mechanical engineer and inspector of steamboat engines
 James Renwick Jr. (1818–1895), was a noted Gothic Revival architect, designer of St. Patrick's Cathedral in New York and the Smithsonian Castle in Washington, D.C., among many other buildings
 Edward S. Renwick (1823–1912), who was a mechanical engineer, inventor and patent expert
 Laura Renwick (1826–1879)

Renwick died in New York City on 12 January 1863.

References

External links

1790 births
1863 deaths
19th-century American scientists
American canal engineers
Columbia College (New York) alumni
Columbia University faculty
Fellows of the American Academy of Arts and Sciences
Natural philosophers
Scientists from Liverpool
19th-century American physicists
Columbia University librarians